Gipsy Kings are a band of Catalan rumba, flamenco, salsa, and pop musicians, founded in 1978 in Arles and Montpellier, in southern France, who perform mostly in Catalan but also mix in Spanish with southern French dialects. Although the group members were born in France, their parents were mostly gitanos (Spanish Romani), who fled Spain during the 1930s Spanish Civil War. They are known for bringing rumba flamenca, a pop-oriented music distantly derived from traditional flamenco and rumba genres, to a worldwide audience. They were originally known as Los Reyes.

History

Beginnings
Gipsy Kings, born in France but brought up within Spanish culture, are largely responsible for bringing the sounds of progressive pop-oriented flamenco music to a worldwide audience. The band started out in Arles, a town in southern France, during the 1970s, when brothers Nicolas and André Reyes, sons of flamenco artist Jose Reyes, teamed up with their cousins Jacques, Maurice, and Tonino Baliardo. At the time, Jose Reyes and Manitas de Plata were a duo who triggered the wider popularity of rumba flamenca. When Reyes split from Manitas de Plata, he started a group made up of his sons, which he called Los Reyes (as well as being their family name, reyes means "kings" in Spanish).

Los Reyes started out as a gypsy band, traveling around France and playing at weddings, festivals, and in the streets. Because they lived so much like gypsies, the band adopted the name Gipsy Kings. Later, they were hired to add color to upper-class parties in such places as Saint-Tropez, but their first two albums attracted little notice. At this point, the Gipsies played traditional flamenco invigorated by Tonino Baliardo's guitar playing and Nicolas Reyes' voice.

The Gipsy King lineup featured a combination of left and right-handed guitarists; three of the Reyes brothers (Nicolas, André, and Patchai) play guitar left-handed, and play left-hand (and sometimes right-hand) guitars that are strung for right-handers (i.e., with the low "E" string on the bottom), while Diego Baliardo plays a left-handed guitar that is strung for left hand (i.e., with the low "E" string on the top). Together with right-handers Canut and Paul Reyes, and Paco Baliardo, these guitarists focus on delivering the strong underpinning rhythms while the more complex leads are performed by the right-handed and conventionally styled Tonino Baliardo.

Success
Gipsy Kings became popular with their self-titled third album, released in 1987 (1989 in the United States), which included the songs "Djobi Djoba", "Bamboléo", and the ballad "Un Amor". The record spent forty weeks on the US charts, one of few Spanish-language albums to do so. 

The band covered "I've Got No Strings" for the 1991 Disney Records direct-to-video album Simply Mad About the Mouse: A Musical Celebration of Imagination. Their cover version of "Hotel California" was an example of fast flamenco guitar leads and rhythmic strumming; it was featured in the 1998 Coen Brothers' movie, The Big Lebowski. 

The 2010 film Toy Story 3 featured their rendition of "You've Got a Friend in Me" in a Spanish-language version, titled "Hay un Amigo en Mi", and the group performed it in a recognizable flamenco style. "Bamboleo" was featured in a grocery store scene in the 2016 film Sing.

The band have been criticised by flamenco purists, but Nicolas Reyes has said in an interview that the flamenco world is not in great shape itself and that the band are proud of their success. Their 1997 album Compas, however, contains more traditional flamenco music.

Solo projects

Some of the individual members of the band have put out their own albums. In 1988, Canut Reyes released his solo project, titled Boléro. He has since released a second album, titled Gitano. André Reyes recorded an album in 1992, but never released it officially. Unlicensed copies were acquired by fans and released online. Tonino Baliardo released his own instrumental album in 2001, titled Essences, re-issuing it in 2003.

In 2022, Nicolas Reyes and Moroccan musician Saad Lamjarred collaborated to pay tribute to King Mohammed VI for the occasion of 30 July's Throne Day, releasing a song called "Viva El Rey Habibna".

Collaborations and covers

Gipsy Kings have collaborated with many musical artists, including with Joan Baez on "Speaking of Dreams", performed with her in 1990. They recorded a cover of the Doobie Brothers' "Long Train Running" with Bananarama, under the pseudonym "Alma de Noche", which was included on a 2013 re-issue of the girl band's 1991 album, Pop Life. They recorded a cover of Frank Sinatra's "My Way" with Francis Cabrel in 1993 as well as the song "Get Up!" with Captain Jack, from the 1999 album The Captain's Revenge. They also published a cover of Bob Marley's "One Love" with his son Ziggy in 2001.

Band members
Gipsy Kings originally consisted of two parent families: Reyes and Baliardo. The Reyes brothers, sons of Jose Reyes, are nephews of Manitas de Plata, while the Baliardo brothers are his sons.
 Nicolas Reyes – founder, lead singer
 François (Canut) Reyes – vocals, guitar
 André Reyes – vocals, guitar
 Patchai Reyes – vocal, guitar
 Pablo (Paul) Reyes – guitar
 Tonino Baliardo – founder, lead guitarist
 Diego Baliardo – guitar
 Paco Baliardo – guitar

Chico Bouchikhi, co-founder of the group, a son-in-law of Jose Reyes, was also a member but left after the 1989 album Mosaïque to create his own band, Chico & the Gypsies.

As of 2015, only founding members Nicolas Reyes and Tonino Baliardo remain in the Gipsy Kings lineup; tour promotional notices bill them as "The Gipsy Kings (featuring Nicolas Reyes and Tonino Baliardo)".

Discography

 Allegria (1982)
 Luna de Fuego (1983)
 Gipsy Kings (1987)
 Mosaïque (1989)
 Este Mundo (1991) – Nominated for a Grammy Award for Best World Music Album
 Love and Liberté (1993) – Won a Latin Grammy Award for Best Pop Album of the Year and nominated for a Grammy Award for Best World Music Album
 Estrellas (1995) – European version of Tierra Gitana with "Forever"
 Tierra Gitana (1996) – US version of Estrellas with "Los Peces en el Rio"; nominated for a Grammy Award for Best World Music Album
 Compas (1997) – Nominated for a Grammy Award for Best World Music Album
 Somos Gitanos (2001)
 Roots (2004)
 Pasajero (2006)
 Savor Flamenco (2013) – Won a Grammy Award for Best World Music Album
 Evidence (2018)
 El Madrileno (2021)

See also
 New flamenco
 Flamenco rumba
 Chico & the Gypsies

References

External links

 
 

 
Flamenco groups
French world music groups
French people of Romani descent
French Romani musical groups
Elektra Records artists
Grammy Award winners
Nonesuch Records artists
Columbia Records artists
Musical groups established in 1978
Catalan rumba
New flamenco
Latin pop music groups
Knitting Factory Records artists